Nina Vodušek (born 9 October 1997), known professionally as Nina Donelli, is a Slovenian singer.

Music career
In early 2014, Donelli signed a publishing deal with Serbian songwriter Dušan Bačić and released her debut single in Croatian, titled "Zašto cure boli glava" (Why Girls Have a Headache). Her debut album Glazba, ljubav, život (Music, Love, Life) was released on 17 January 2017 through Croatia Records.

Discography

Albums
Glazba, ljubav, život (2017)

Singles

References

External links

21st-century Slovenian women singers
Living people
1997 births
People from Styria (Slovenia)
Slovenian pop singers
Slovenian songwriters